Michael Dalton Allred is an American comic book artist and writer most famous for his independent comics creations, Madman and iZombie. His style is often compared to pop art, as well as commercial and comic art of the 1950s and 1960s.

Early life
Allred was raised as a member of the Church of Jesus Christ of Latter-day Saints. Upon his parents' divorce, he was raised with his father in Oregon, while his brothers and mother moved to Utah. He considers himself a Mormon, though a liberal-leaning one, and has stated that he still identifies with the beliefs, and considers the Book of Mormon to be a phenomenal and fascinating story, irrespective of its factual accuracy.

Career
Mike Allred began his career as a radio host on KYES AM 950 (KY95) in Roseburg, Oregon. He later became a television reporter in Europe, and started drawing comics in 1989 with the 104-page graphic novel Dead Air (Slave Labor Graphics). The story loosely followed his stint in radio as a sidebar to the true focus of the novel, the effects of post-nuclear war over a small Oregon town. He followed this up with his similarly titled works Graphique Musique (1990) and Grafik Muzik (Caliber Comics 1990–1991), in which he set out the style that he was to become known for with his most famous character, Madman.

Madman first appeared as Frank Einstein in Creatures of the Id and Grafik Muzik published in 1990, but it wasn't until March 1992 that the first Madman miniseries debuted from Tundra Publishing in March 1992. The series gained further recognition with its move to Dark Horse Comics in April 1994, where it was relaunched as Madman Comics and went on to be nominated for several Harvey Awards. Madman Comics ran for 20 issues and ended in 2000. From 2007–2009, Image Comics published Madman: Atomic Comics for 17 issues.

Allred drew part of the 1993 "Worlds' End" story arc in Neil Gaiman's The Sandman series.

Allred appeared as himself in the 1997 feature film Chasing Amy as part of the opening scene at a comic book convention, signing copies of his comic Madman. He also provides the artwork for the fictional comic book Bluntman and Chronic.

Allred himself gained further mainstream attention with the science-fiction/rock-and-roll comic Red Rocket 7 (Dark Horse, 1997) and his art for writer Peter Milligan's series X-Force, which he began drawing in July 2001, and subsequently became X-Statix. In 2000, AAA Pop published Allred's The Atomics, featuring a group of beatniks with superpowers. Issue #116 of X-Force, the first collaboration between Allred and Milligan, was the first Marvel comic book to not have the Comics Code Authority stamp of approval since 1971.

In 2004 and 2005, Allred wrote and drew The Golden Plates, an adaptation of the Book of Mormon. Allred is a Latter-Day Saint, and completed much of the work on this project in collaboration with his wife Laura Allred.

Allred worked again with Neil Gaiman in 2009 on the Metamorpho feature in Wednesday Comics. The Madman All-New Giant-Size Super-Ginchy Special! was published in April 2011. Allred and writer Matt Fraction crafted a Fantastic Four spinoff series, FF, in 2013. The following year, Allred and writer Dan Slott launched a new Silver Surfer series at Marvel. His comic book series iZombie, which ran from 2010 to 2012, was adapted into a 2015 television series of the same name. Allred drew the 1960s variant cover for Action Comics #1000 (June 2018).

His wife, Laura, frequently works as his colorist.

Awards
Allred's retro-styled artwork is a frequent nominee for comics awards such as the Harveys, the Eisners, and the Eagles. In his career, he has received:

 2005 Special AML Award for The Golden Plates
 2009 Inkpot Award
 2011 AML Award in the category of "Special Award in Graphical Narrative" for a lifetime of comic art
 2015 The television adaptation of his Vertigo comic book series iZombie was the recipient of the Best New Fandom award at the 2015 MTV Fandom Awards
 2016 The Eisner Award for Best Single Issue/One Shot (Silver Surfer #11)
 2021 The Eisner Award for Best Penciller/Inker (Bowie: Stardust, Rayguns and Moonage Daydreams)

Bibliography
 Dead Air (Slave Labor Graphics, 1989)
 Graphique Musique #1–3 (Slave Labor Graphics, 1989–1990)
 Creatures Of The Id #1 (Caliber Press, 1990)
 Grafik Muzik #1–4 (Caliber Press, 1990–1991)
 The Everyman (Epic Comics, 1991)
 Madman #1–3 (Tundra Publishing, 1992)
 Madman Adventures #1–3 (Tundra Publishing, 1992–1993)
 Vertigo Visions: The Geek #1 (DC Comics/Vertigo, 1993)
 Vertical (DC Comics/Vertigo, 1993, with writer Steven T. Seagle)
 Vertigo Jam #1 (DC Comics/Vertigo, 1993)
 Sandman #54 (DC Comics/Vertigo, 1993, with writer Neil Gaiman)
 Madman Comics #1–20 (Dark Horse Comics, 1994–2000)
 Untold Tales of Spider-Man '96 #1 (Marvel Comics, 1996)
 Superman/Madman Hullabaloo #1–3 (DC Comics/Dark Horse Comics, 1997)
 Red Rocket 7 #1–7 (Dark Horse Comics, 1997–1998)
 Feeders #1 (Dark Horse Comics, 1999)
 The Atomics #1–15 (AAA Pop, 2000–2001)
 Superman and Batman: World's Funnest #1 (DC Comics, 2001) 
 Green Lantern/Superman: Legend of the Green Flame #1 (DC Comics, 2001) 
 X-Force #116–123, 125-128 (Marvel Comics, 2001–2002, with writer Peter Milligan)
 Ultimate Marvel Team-Up #4–5 (Marvel Comics, 2001)
 Catwoman vol. 3 #1–4 (inker) (DC Comics, 2002)
 Just Imagine Stan Lee with Chris Bachalo Creating Catwoman #1 (inker) (DC Comics, 2002)
 X-Statix #1–4, 6–9, 11–19, 21–26 (Marvel Comics, 2002–2004, with writer Peter Milligan)
 Vertigo X Anniversary Preview #1 (DC Comics, 2003)
 Solo #7 (DC Comics, 2005)
 Madman Atomic Comics #1–17 (Image Comics, 2007–2009)
 Fables #76 (DC Comics, 2008, with writer Bill Willingham)
 Wednesday Comics #1–12 (Metamorpho) (DC Comics, 2009, with writer Neil Gaiman)
 Nation X #1 and 4 (Marvel Comics, 2009–2010)
 iZombie #1–28 (Vertigo, 2010–2012)
 Daredevil vol. 3 #17 (2012)
 Wolverine and the X-Men #17 (2012)
 FF vol. 2 #1–5, 7-8, 10-16 (Marvel Comics, 2013-2014)
 Batman Black and White vol. 2 #4 (DC Comics, 2014)
 Silver Surfer vol. 7 #1–15 (Marvel Comics, 2014–2016)
 Art Ops #1–5, 8, 12 (DC Comics/Vertigo, 2015–2016)
 Silver Surfer vol. 8 #1–14 (Marvel Comics, 2016–2017)
 Bug!: The Adventures of Forager #1–6 (Young Animal, 2017)
 Batman '66 Meets the Legion of Super-Heroes #1 (DC Comics, 2017)
 Infinity Countdown: Adam Warlock #1 (Marvel Comics, 2018)
 Peter Parker: The Spectacular Spider-Man Annual #1 (Marvel Comics, 2018)
 Giant-Size X-Statix #1 (Marvel Comics, 2019, with writer Peter Milligan)
 Bowie: Stardust, Rayguns and Moonage Daydreams (Insight Comics, 2020)
 X-Ray Robot #1–4 (Dark Horse Comics, 2020)
 X-Cellent #1–5 (Marvel Comics, 2022, with writer Peter Milligan)
 The X-Cellent #1–5 (Marvel Comics, 2023, with writer Peter Milligan)

Covers only
Caliber Presents #15 (Caliber Comics, 1990)
Cheval Noir #39 (Dark Horse Comics, 1993)
The Comics Journal #164 (Fantagraphics Books, 1993)
Hero Illustrated Special Edition #2 (Warrior Publications, 1994)
Classic Star Wars: The Early Adventures #1 (Dark Horse Comics, 1994)
Dark Horse Presents #100–0, 100–5 (Dark Horse Comics, 1995)
Heartbreakers #3 (Dark Horse Comics, 1996)
Jay & Silent Bob #2 (Oni Press, 1998)
Vertigo: Winter's Edge #2 (DC Comics/Vertigo, 1999)
Empty Love Stories #2 (Funny Valentine Press, 1999)
Oni Press Summer Vacation Supercolor Fun Special #1 (Oni Press, 2000)
Comicology #2 (TwoMorrows Publishing, 2000)
Oni Press Color Special #1–2 (Oni Press, 2001–2002)
Madman Picture Exhibition #4 (AAA Pop Comics, 2002)
X-Statix #20 (Marvel Comics, 2004)
Spider-Man Unlimited vol. 2 #6 (Marvel Comics, 2005)
Marvel Knights 4 #23–24 (Marvel Comics, 2005–2006)
X-Statix Presents: Dead Girl #1–5 (Marvel Comics, 2006)
Kabuki #9 (Icon Comics, 2007)
Spider-Man Fairy Tales #4 (Marvel Comics, 2007)
Popgun Volume 1 (Image Comics, 2007)
The Perhapanauts Annual #1 (Image Comics, 2008)
Jersey Gods #1, 4, 6–10, 12 (Image Comics, 2009–2010)
Rapture #3 (Dark Horse Comics, 2009)
Fractured Fables gn (Silverline Books, 2010)
Captain Action Season 2 #1 (Moonstone Books, 2010)
Teen Titans #86 (DC Comics, 2010)
glamourpuss #19 (Aardvark-Vanaheim, 2011)
iZombie #12, 18, 21, 24 (DC Comics/Vertigo, 2011–2012)
The Next Issue Project #3 (Image Comics, 2011)
Star Trek/Legion of Super-Heroes #5 (IDW Publishing, 2012)
It Girl! and the Atomics #1–12 (Image Comics, 2012–2013)
Before Watchmen: Silk Spectre #3 (DC Comics, 2012)
Happy! #1 (Image, 2012)
Mars Attacks The Real Ghostbusters #1 (IDW Publishing, 2012)
Batman '66 #1–3, 5, 7 (DC Comics, 2013–2014)
All New Doop #1 (Marvel Comics, 2014)
Batman ’66 Meets Steed And Mrs Peel #1-6 (DC Comics, 2016)
Booster Gold/The Flintstones Special #1 (DC Comics, 2017)
Action Comics #1000 variant (DC Comics, 2018)
Dick Tracy: Dead or Alive #1-4 (IDW Publishing, 2018-2019)

Other work

As artist
 Mallrats (1995) (Opening sequence)
 Chasing Amy (1997) (Bluntman and Chronic artwork)
 The Faculty (1998) (Logo for The Hornets football team)
 Ingredients the Band – Bears Driving Trains (2006) (album cover)
 Skyscape – Zetacarnosa (2009) (album cover)
 iZombie (TV series) (2014) (Title sequence intro)
Christmas Party (2018) (The Monkees album cover)

As writer
 Astroesque (1996)
 G-Men from Hell (2000)

As musician
 The Gear – Son of Red Rocket Seven (1998)
 The Gear – Left Of Center Of The Universe (2009)

References

External links

 
 
 Mike Allred Image Gallery at Comic Art Community
 Mike Allred at Mike's Amazing World of Comics
 Michael Allred at the Unofficial Handbook of Marvel Comics Creators

Year of birth missing (living people)
20th-century American male artists
21st-century American male artists
American comics artists
American comics writers
DC Comics people
Inkpot Award winners
Latter Day Saints from Oregon
Living people
Marvel Comics people
People from Roseburg, Oregon
Eisner Award winners for Best Penciller/Inker or Penciller/Inker Team